Ralph Scott may refer to:
 Ralph James Scott (1905–1983), American Congressman from North Carolina
 Ralph H. Scott (1903–1989), American politician from North Carolina
 Ralph Scott (American football) (1894–1936), American football player
 Ralph J. Scott (fireboat) (1925–2003), American fireboat
 Mickey Scott (Ralph Robert Scott, 1947–2011), American baseballer

Scott, Ralph